Kamyshevka is a rural locality (a selo) in Nekrasovsky Selsoviet of Belogorsky District, Amur Oblast, Russia. The population was 60 as of 2018.

Geography 
The village is located 18 km south-west from Belogorsk.

References 

Rural localities in Belogorsky District